Yad Rambam (lit. Rambam Memorial) is a moshav in central Israel. Located in the Shephelah near Ramle, it falls under the jurisdiction of Gezer Regional Council.

History
The moshav was founded on 30 October 1955 and was named after Maimonides (known in Hebrew as Rambam). Most of the founders were immigrants from Fes in Morocco.

Notable residents
Jo Amar

References

Moshavim
Populated places established in 1955
Populated places in Central District (Israel)
1955 establishments in Israel
Moroccan-Jewish culture in Israel